4,4'-Diaminodicyclohexylmethane is the name for organic compounds with the formula CH2(C6H10NH2)2.  It is classified as a diamine. In the epoxy industry it is often referred to as PACM, short for para-diamino­dicyclohexyl­methane.  It is used as a curing agent for epoxy resins It finds particular use in epoxy flooring. Another use is to produce diisocyanates, which are precursors to polyurethane.  The mixture is a colorless solid, but typical samples are yellowish and oily.  The compound is produced as a mixture of three isomers by the hydrogenation of methylenedianiline.  These isomers are, in decreasing order of their yield from the hydrogenation, trans-trans, cis-trans, and a small amount of cis-cis.

Uses
This diamine is mainly used to make epoxy resin curing agents for CASE (Coatings, Adhesives, Sealants, and Elastomers) applications especially flooring. Another application arises from its reaction with phosgene to produce a cycloaliphatic diisocyanate Hydrogenated MDI, which is used to produce light stable polyurethanes. The substance may also be used as a chemical intermediate to make other molecules.

4,4'-Diaminodicyclohexylmethane was used in producing a polyamide called Qiana, since discontinued.  For this application, the condensation partner was dodecanoic acid.

Safety
It is an alkaline skin irritant. It does not exhibit mutagenic properties.

See also
 Epoxy
 IPDA
 1,3-BAC
 MXDA 
 DCH-99

References

Diamines